Carlos Mora (born 18 March 2001), is a Costa Rican professional footballer who plays for Liga Deportiva Alajuelense in Liga FPD, the Costa Rican top division.

Career
Mora joined Liga Deportiva Alajuelense as a youngster and played age groups levels from under-15 where he was heavily tutored by Mauricio Montero. He made his full team debut on 16 February, 2020, when he replaced Ariel Lassiter as a substitute in a 1- 0 away victory over Santos de Guápiles. He scored for his first goal for the club on the 4 November, 2020 in a CONCACAF League match against Cibao FC of the Dominican Republic which his side won 3-0. Mora was in the squad when his team won the 2020 CONCACAF League Final 3-2 against Saprissa on 3 February, 2021.

International career
Mora received his first call up for the senior Costa Rica national football team for matches against the Canadian, El Salvadorian, and American teams and subsequently made his first appearance for the national team on 30 March, 2022 against the USA.

References

External links

2001 births
Living people
Costa Rican footballers